Kevin F. Hallock (born March 10, 1969) is an American economist and academic administrator serving as president of the University of Richmond since 2021. Before coming to Richmond, he was the Dean of the SC Johnson College of Business at Cornell University from 2018 to 2021.

Academic career
Kevin Hallock was born on March 10, 1969, in Palo Alto, California but grew up in Hadley, Massachusetts. He graduated first in his class from Hopkins Academy in 1987, upon which he attended the University of Massachusetts at Amherst, where he was inducted into Phi Beta Kappa. Hallock graduated Summa Cum Laude with a degree in economics in 1991 and subsequently received a Master of Arts in 1993 and a Ph.D. in 1995 from Princeton University.

Afterwards, Hallock took up a position as a professor of economics and of labor and industrial relations at the University of Illinois at Urbana-Champaign, where he stayed from 1995 to 2005. In 2005, he began teaching in the department of economics at Cornell University, serving as the Donald C. Opatrny ’74 Chair of the Department of Economics from 2012 to 2015, the Kenneth F. Kahn ’69 Dean of the School of Industrial and Labor Relations from 2015 to 2018, and the Dean of the SC Johnson College of Business from 2018 to 2021. On March 4, 2021, the University of Richmond announced that its Board of Trustees had unanimously elected Hallock as the institution's 11th president.

Personal life
Hallock and his wife, Tina, met when they were four years old and were married in 1991. They have two children.

References

 

Living people
University of Richmond faculty
Presidents of the University of Richmond
1969 births
People from Palo Alto, California
People from Hadley, Massachusetts
University of Massachusetts Amherst alumni
Princeton University alumni
Cornell University faculty